Peter B. Armentrout (born 1953) is a researcher in thermochemistry, kinetics, and dynamics of simple and complex chemical reactions.  He is a Chemistry Professor at the University of Utah.

Career
Armentrout received his B.S. degree from Case Western Reserve University in 1975 and earned his Ph.D. from the California Institute of Technology in 1980.  During these studies he determined that much of the published information on thermodynamic states was not reliable, or was presented in differing formats.  When he became a research professor he used this frustration as motivation to invent and construct the guided ion-beam tandem mass spectrometer, which provided highly accurate thermodynamic measurements.  With this instrument in hand, he went on to invent or improve tools to analyze those measurements, including advanced computer algorithms.  He has published much data on the properties of transition metals, and has worked most recently on the thermodynamic properties of biological systems.

Awards 
 1984–1989 National Science Foundation Presidential Young Investigator Award
 2001 Biemann Medal
 Case Western Chemistry Department - Outstanding Alumnus of the Year
 American Chemical Society Utah Section - Award of Chemistry
 Member of Phi Kappa Phi Honor Society
 2009 American Chemical Society – Award for Outstanding Achievement in Mass Spectrometry

References

21st-century American chemists
Mass spectrometrists
California Institute of Technology alumni
Case Western Reserve University alumni
Living people
University of Utah faculty
1953 births
Fellows of the American Physical Society